Lighthorse (or Light Horse) was the name given by the Five Civilized Tribes of the United States to their mounted police force. The Lighthorse were generally organized into companies and assigned to different districts. Perhaps the most famous were the Cherokee Lighthorsemen which had their origins in Georgia. Although the mounted police were disbanded when the Five Civilized Tribes lost their tribal lands in the late 19th century, some tribes still use the Lighthorse name for elements of their police forces.One unrecognized native lineage clan in Idaho, the Klamawah, has a small security force called Lighthorsemen as security for their gatherings and facilities. These security agents are required to be retired tribal/local police officers.
Cherokee Light Horse
Chickasaw Light Horse
Choctaw Light Horse
Creek Light Horse
Seminole Light Horse

Cherokee
In 1797, the Cherokees created organizations called "regulating companies" to deal with horse theft and other property crimes. The regulating companies were a mounted tribal police force, empowered to enforce tribal laws. They began to be called "Lighthorsemen" in the 1820s. Their authority expanded to apprehending criminals, whom they turned over to tribal courts for trial and sentencing. The Lighthorsemen's scope was then extended to more serious crimes including murder, rape and robbery. They also enforced the tribal laws against drunkenness. One author asserted that the Cherokees took the force's name from General Henry "Lighthorse Harry" Lee, who got the nickname because his cavalry moved so quickly.

On November 13, 1844, the Cherokee National Council authorized the formation of a lighthorse company. Composed of a captain, a lieutenant and twenty four horsemen. They were to arrest all fugitives from justice in the Cherokee Nation. For several years the lighthorsemen also served as judges and jurors, administering punishments themselves. Usually, they punished those convicted of minor crimes by whipping. In 1874, the Cherokees built a prison at Tahlequah. It was the only Indian Nation to do so.

Choctaw
The Treaty of Doak's Stand in 1820, appropriated US$600 per year to the Choctaw Nation to organize and maintain the Choctaw Lighthorsemen. These men were given the authority to arrest, try and punish those who broke tribal laws. The first corps became operational in 1824. Peter Pitchlynn became the head of this force in 1825.  After the Choctaws were forcibly removed to Indian Territory, as part of the Indian Removal (1831-1833), the Lighthorsemen reported to the tribal Chief.

The Choctaw Constitution of 1838 specified that "...It shall be the duty of any of the light horsemen to proclaim to the candidates or their representatives to form into separate lines; the voters forming in a line with such candidates as they wish to elect; and there shall be two or more judges appointed by the Captain of the Light-horse company to determine the number of electors in each line, and their qualifications; and one of said judges shall publicly state the number of voters in each line, and proclaim the person having the highest number elected; and it shall be the duty of the judges of the elections to report to the district clerks the names of the persons elected, and to what office, and by what majority; whose duty it shall be to record the same and inform the district Chief of the result of the election."

According to historian Carolyn Foreman, the treaty stipulated, "...that all men, both white and red, may be compelled to pay their just debts, it is stipulated and agreed,that the sum of two hundred dollars shall be appropriated by the United States, for each district, annually, and placed in the hands of the agent, to pay the expenses incurred in raising and establishing said corps; which is to act as executive officers, in maintaining good order, and compelling bad men to remove from the nation, who are not authorized to live In it by a regular permit from the agent."

Light horsemen rode their own horses and used their own weapons.

Creek
At the outbreak of the Civil War, the Confederate States of America (CSA) made a treaty with the Creek Nation. Among many other provisions, the CSA promised to provide CS$600 per year for the support of lighthorsemen.

During 1882–1883, a group of dissident Creeks led by Isparhecher revolted against the leadership of Principal Chief Samuel Checote. Checote responded by ordering the Creek Lighthorsemen to put down the rebellion. He soon put Pleasant Porter as the leader of the lighthorsemen. Porter and his men were successful  in forcing the dissidents to leave Creek territory and take refuge in Sac and Fox territory and later in Kiowa territory. The dissidents found they were unwelcome in both places. They returned to make peace with the majority of the tribe. Porter later became principal chief of the Creek Nation (1899–1907).

Seminole
The Seminoles were the last of the Five Civilized Tribes to establish their own police force. They had no funds for that, and during the American Civil War, the Seminole Government was dysfunctional. It was 1876 before Governor hired A. Q. Brown, a young cattle drover from Texas, as the first lighthorseman.

Sources
Foreman, Carolyn Thomas. "The Light-Horse in the Indian Territory", Chronicles of Oklahoma 34:1 (January 1956) 17-43 (retrieved August 17, 2006)
Luna-Firebaugh, Eileen.   Tribal Policing: Asserting Sovereignty, Seeking Justice. 2007. University of Arizona Press. Available on Google Books.

References

External links
Muscogee (Creek) Lighthorse
Seminole Light Horse

Native American tribal police
Gendarmerie
Lawmen of the American Old West
Native American history of Oklahoma
Pre-statehood history of Oklahoma
Mounted police